The 2017 SLFA First Division was the 39th season of top-division association football in Saint Lucia.

A total of seven teams participated in the competition, with last season's champions Survivals FC not participating. The title was won by Northern United All Stars.

External links
RSSSF.com

References

SLFA First Division
Saint Lucia
football